St. James Episcopal Church, or variants thereof, may refer to:
(sorted by state, then city/town)

United States

California
 St. James Episcopal Church (Sonora, California)
 St. James' Episcopal Church (South Pasadena, California)

Colorado
 St. James Episcopal Church (Meeker, Colorado), listed on the National Register of Historic Places (NRHP) in Rio Blanco County

Connecticut
 St. James Episcopal Church (New London, Connecticut), listed on the NRHP in New London County

Delaware
 St. James' Church (Newport, Delaware)
 St. James Episcopal Church, Mill Creek

Florida
 St. James' Episcopal Church (Lake City, Florida)
 St. James Episcopal Church (Ormond Beach, Florida)

Idaho
 St. James Episcopal Church (Mountain Home, Idaho), listed on the NRHP in Elmore County
 St. James Episcopal Church (Payette, Idaho), listed on the NRHP in Payette County

Illinois
 St. James Episcopal Church (Lewistown, Illinois), listed on the NRHP in Fulton County
 St. James Episcopal Church (McLeansboro, Illinois), listed on the NRHP in Hamilton County

Indiana
 St. James Memorial Chapel (Howe, Indiana)

Iowa
 St. James Episcopal Church (Oskaloosa, Iowa), listed on the NRHP in Mahaska County

Kentucky
 Saint James' Episcopal Church (Pewee Valley, Kentucky)
 Saint James' Episcopal Church (Prestonsburg, Kentucky)
St. James Episcopal Church (Shelbyville, Kentucky)

Louisiana
 St. James Episcopal Church (Baton Rouge, Louisiana), listed on the NRHP in East Baton Rouge Parish

Maine
 St. James Episcopal Church (Old Town, Maine), listed on the NRHP in Penobscot County

Maryland
 St James Episcopal Church (Baltimore, Maryland)

Massachusetts
 St. James Episcopal Church (Amesbury, Massachusetts)
 St. James Episcopal Church (Cambridge, Massachusetts), listed on the NRHP in Middlesex County

Michigan
 St. James Episcopal Church (Grosse Ile, Michigan), listed on the NRHP in Wayne County
 Saint James' Episcopal Church (Sault Ste. Marie, Michigan)

Minnesota
 St. James Episcopal Church (Minneapolis, Minnesota), better known as "Saint James On-The-Parkway" (or "St. James OTP")

Montana
 St. James Episcopal Church and Rectory (Bozeman, Montana), listed on the NRHP in Gallatin County
 St. James Episcopal Church and Parish House (Lewistown, Montana), listed on the NRHP in Fergus

New York
 St. James Episcopal Church (Batavia, New York)
 St. James Episcopal Church (Fort Edward, New York), listed on the NRHP in Washington County
 St. James Episcopal Church (Hyde Park, New York), Episcopal Diocese of New York
 St. James Episcopal Church (Lake George, New York)
 St. James' Episcopal Church (Manhattan)
 St. James' Episcopal Church and Parish House, The Bronx, New York, listed on the NRHP in Bronx County
 St. James Episcopal Church, part of the Skaneateles Historic District in Skaneateles, New York
 St. James Episcopal Church (Watkins Glen, New York), listed on the NRHP in Schuyler County

North Carolina
 St. James Episcopal Church and Rectory (Kittrell, North Carolina), listed on the NRHP in Vance County
 St. James Episcopal Church (Wilmington, North Carolina), the oldest church in the city of Wilmington

Ohio
 St. James Episcopal Church (Boardman, Ohio), listed on the NRHP in Mahoning County
 St. James Episcopal Church (Painesville, Ohio), listed on the NRHP in Lake County
 St. James Episcopal Church (Zanesville, Ohio), listed on the NRHP in Muskingum County

Oklahoma
 St. James Episcopal Church (Wagoner, Oklahoma), Oklahoma's oldest Episcopal church still in use.

Oregon
 St. James Episcopal Church (Coquille, Oregon), listed on the NRHP in Coos County

Pennsylvania
 St. James Episcopal Church (Muncy, Pennsylvania), listed on the NRHP in Lycoming County
 Church of St. James the Less, Philadelphia, Pennsylvania, National Historic Landmark

South Carolina
 St. James Episcopal Church (Santee, South Carolina), in Georgetown, SC, listed on the NRHP and as an NHL in Charleston County

Tennessee
 St. James Episcopal Church (Cumberland Furnace, Tennessee), listed on the NRHP in Dickson County
 St. James Episcopal Church (Greeneville, Tennessee)

Texas
 St. James Episcopal Church (La Grange, Texas), listed on the NRHP in Fayette County

Utah
 St. James Episcopal Church (Midvale, Utah)

Vermont
 St. James' Episcopal Church (Arlington, Vermont), one of the oldest churches in the United States

Virginia
 St. James Episcopal Church (Portsmouth, Virginia)
 St. James Episcopal Church (Richmond, Virginia)
 St. James' Episcopal Church (Warrenton, Virginia)

Washington, D.C.
 St. John's Episcopal Church, Lafayette Square

Wisconsin
 St. James' Episcopal Church (Manitowoc, Wisconsin)
 St. James Episcopal Church (Milwaukee, Wisconsin), listed on the NRHP in Milwaukee County

See also 
 St. James Church (disambiguation)
 St. James Catholic Church (disambiguation)